Johan Fog Clementz (27 September 1894 – 14 February 1952) was a Norwegian boxer who competed in the 1920 Summer Olympics. In 1920 he was eliminated in the first round of the light heavyweight class after losing his fight to Thomas Holdstock.

References

External links
 List of Norwegian boxers 

1894 births
1952 deaths
Light-heavyweight boxers
Olympic boxers of Norway
Boxers at the 1920 Summer Olympics
Norwegian male boxers
20th-century Norwegian people